The Serpent's Egg may refer to:

"a serpent's egg", a line from Shakespeare's Julius Caesar
The Serpent's Egg (film), a 1977 film directed by Ingmar Bergman and set in 1920s Berlin
The Serpent's Egg (album), by Dead Can Dance, 1988
"The Serpent's Egg" (Defiance), a television episode
The Serpent's Egg, a 1950 novel by David Duncan